Diego Guerra Taixeirão (born November 6, 1990) is a Brazilian footballer who plays for Tapachula as a defender.

Honours
Cafetaleros de Tapachula
 Ascenso MX: Clausura 2018

Portuguesa
2021 Campeonato Carioca : 2021 Seleção Campeonato Carioca

References

External links
Profile at Soccerway

1990 births
Living people
Brazilian footballers
Brazilian expatriate footballers
Expatriate footballers in Mexico
Association football defenders
Friburguense Atlético Clube players
Macaé Esporte Futebol Clube players
Kazma SC players
Madureira Esporte Clube players
Cafetaleros de Chiapas footballers
Associação Atlética Portuguesa (RJ) players
Campeonato Brasileiro Série C players
Campeonato Brasileiro Série D players
Ascenso MX players
Expatriate footballers in Kuwait
Kuwait Premier League players
Brazilian expatriate sportspeople in Kuwait
Brazilian expatriate sportspeople in Mexico
Footballers from Rio de Janeiro (city)